WFCM may refer to:

 WFCM-FM, a radio station (91.7 FM) licensed to Murfreesboro, Tennessee, United States
 WYJV, a radio station (710 AM) licensed to Smyrna, Tennessee, which held the call sign WFCM from 1997 to 2018